Tamgha-i-Basalat is an award of the Pakistan Armed Forces. It is a non operational award.

See also 
 Awards and decorations of the Pakistan Armed Forces

References

External links 
 Decorations and Medals of Pakistan
 Military Awards of Pakistan (archived 5 July 2009)

Military awards and decorations of Pakistan